Heliophanus xanthopes is a jumping spider species in the genus Heliophanus.  It was first described by Wanda Wesołowska in 2003 and lives in Ethiopia.

References

Endemic fauna of Ethiopia
Spiders described in 1986
Fauna of Ethiopia
Salticidae
Spiders of Africa
Taxa named by Wanda Wesołowska